Margarethe Jacoba Huberta "Greetje" den Ouden-Dekkers (1 January 1940 – 18 December 2022) was a Dutch teacher and politician. A member of the People's Party for Freedom and Democracy, she served in the House of Representatives from 1982 to 1986.

From 1989 to 1997 Den Ouden-Dekkers served as chairperson of the Dutch Emancipation Council.

Den Ouden-Dekkers died in Wageningen on 18 December 2022, at the age of 82.

References

1940 births
2022 deaths
Dutch educators
Members of the House of Representatives (Netherlands)
People's Party for Freedom and Democracy politicians
Democratic Socialists '70 politicians
People from Bergen op Zoom